Fedorenko  is a Ukrainian surname meaning son or daughter of "Fedir" (the Ukrainian rendition of Theodore).

It may refer to:

Andriy Fedorenko, a Ukrainian football player.
Borys Fedorenko, Ukrainian painter.
Dmitri Nikolayevitch Fedorenko, Russian entomologist
Fyodor Fedorenko, sentenced to death for treason and participation in the Holocaust and executed.
Mykola Fedorenko, retired Soviet football player and a current Ukrainian football coach.
Nikolai Fedorenko, Soviet philologist, orientalist, statesman, public figure, professor (1953), and corresponding member of the Soviet Academy of Sciences (1958).
Nikolay Fedorenko, Russian economist and chemist.
Yakov Fedorenko, Soviet general during World War II.

It may also refer to the landmark legal case of Fedorenko v. United States.

See also
 
Fedoruk
Fedorchuk

Ukrainian-language surnames
Surnames of Ukrainian origin
Patronymic surnames